Dobber may refer to:

People 
 Andrzej Dobber (born 1961), Polish operatic singer (baritone)
 Rini Dobber (born 1943), Dutch Olympic swimmer
 Bob Lanier, (born 1948), nicknamed "The Dobber", an American professional basketball player

Other uses
 Mud dobber, a wasp that builds its nest from mud
 Dobber (merchandise), shirts, jeans, and license plates associated with Glenn Dobbs
 Philip "Dobber" Dobson, a character on the British ITV show Coronation Street
 A size of marble

See also
 Dob (disambiguation)
 Dobbert, a large ball bearing